Larreoideae is a subfamily of the flowering plant family Zygophyllaceae.

Genera
 Bulnesia Gay
 Guaiacum L.
 Larrea Cav.
 Pintoa Gay
 Porlieria Ruiz & Pav.

References

 
Rosid subfamilies